Edgar Gómez (born October 4, 1944) is a Puerto Rican jazz double bassist, known for his work with the Bill Evans Trio from 1966 to 1977.

Biography
Gómez moved with his family from Puerto Rico at a young age to New York, where he was raised. He started on double bass in the New York City school system at the age of eleven and at age thirteen went to the New York City High School of Music & Art. He played in the Newport Festival Youth Band (led by Marshall Brown) from 1959 to 1961, and graduated from Juilliard in 1963.

He played with musicians such as Gerry Mulligan, Marian McPartland, Paul Bley, Steps Ahead, and Chick Corea. He spent a total of eleven years with the Bill Evans Trio, which included performances in the United States, Europe and Asia, as well as dozens of recordings.

His career mainly consists of working as an accompanist, a position suited for his quick reflexes and flexibility. In addition to working as a studio musician for many famous jazz musicians, he has recorded as a leader for Columbia Records, Projazz and Stretch. Many of his recent recordings as a leader are co-led by the jazz pianist Mark Kramer.

In May 2013, Gómez was awarded an Honorary Doctorate of Music from Berklee College of Music in Valencia, Spain. This was the first honorary doctorate granted at the college's new international campus in Spain.

Discography

As leader/co-leader

As sideman

With John Abercrombie
 Structures (Chesky, 2006)

With Warren Bernhardt
 Blue Montreux (Arista, 1978)
 Blue Montreux II (Arista, 1979)
 Warren Bernhardt Trio (DMP, 1983)

With Paul Bley
 Barrage (ESP-Disk, 1965)

With Joanne Brackeen
 Prism (Choice, 1978)
 Keyed In (Tappan Zee, 1979)
 Ancient Dynasty (Tappan Zee, 1980)
 Special Identity (Antilles, 1981)
 Breath of Brazil (Concord Picante, 1991)
 Where Legends Dwell (Ken Music, 1992)
 Take a Chance (Concord Picante, 1993)

With Randy Brecker
 Score (Solid State, 1969)

With Bill Bruford and Ralph Towner
 If Summer Had Its Ghosts (DGM, 1997)

With Frank Caruso and Bob Rummage
 Chosen (CD Baby, 2017)

With Joe Chambers
 Isla Verde (Paddle Wheel, 1995)

With Santos Chillemi
 Trinidad (Maracatu, 1991)
 Au Gre Du Temps (Frémeaux & Associés, 2004)

With Billy Cobham
 Drum 'n' Voice - All That Groove (Sony Music, 2001)

With Chick Corea
 The Leprechaun (Polydor, 1976)
 The Mad Hatter (Polydor, 1978)
 Friends (Polydor, 1978)
 Three Quartets (Warner Bros. Records, 1981)
 The Boston Three Party (Stretch Records, 2007)
 From Miles (Stretch Records, 2007)
 Further Explorations (Concord Jazz, 2012)

With Jack DeJohnette
 The DeJohnette Complex (Milestone, 1969)
 New Directions (ECM, 1978)
 New Directions in Europe (ECM Records, 1980)

With Armen Donelian
 Stargazer (Atlas Records, 1981)

With Eliane Elias
Illusions (Denon, 1986)
Cross Currents (Denon, 1987)
Eliane Elias Plays Jobim (Blue Note, 1990)
Fantasia (Blue Note, 1992)
Paulistana (Blue Note, 1993)
Music from Man of La Mancha (Concord, 2017)

With Peter Erskine
 Peter Erskine (Contemporary, 1982)

With Bill Evans
 A Simple Matter of Conviction (Verve, 1966)
 California Here I Come (Verve, 1967)
 Bill Evans at the Montreux Jazz Festival (Verve, 1968)
 What's New (Verve, 1969)
 Autumn Leaves (Lotus, 1969)
 Jazzhouse (Milestone, 1969)
 You're Gonna Hear From Me (Milestone, 1969)
 From Left to Right (MGM, 1970)
 Quiet Now (Charly, 1970)
 Montreux II (CTI, 1970)
 Homewood (Red Bird Records, 1970)
 The Bill Evans Album (Columbia, 1971)
 Two Super Bill Evans Trios: Live In Europe! (Unique Jazz, 1972)
 Living Time with George Russell Orchestra (Columbia, 1972)
 The Tokyo Concert (Fantasy, 1973)
 Eloquence (Fantasy, 1973)
 Half Moon Bay (Milestone, 1973)
 Since We Met (Fantasy, 1974)
 Re: Person I Knew (Fantasy, 1974)
 Symbiosis (MPS, 1974)
 But Beautiful (Milestone, 1974)
 Blue in Green: The Concert in Canada (Milestone, 1974)
 Live In Europe, Vol.1 & Vol.2 (EPM Musique, 1974)
 Intuition (Fantasy, 1974)
 Montreux III (Fantasy, 1975)
 With Monica Zetterlund - Swedish Concert 1975 (Nova Disc, 1975)
 In His Own Way (Nova Disc, 1975)
 Crosscurrents (Fantasy, 1977)
 I Will Say Goodbye (Fantasy, 1977)
 You Must Believe in Spring (Warner Bros., 1977)
 From The 70's - Unreleased live recordings from 1973-74 (Fantasy, 1983/Original Jazz Classics, 2002)
 Live In Paris 1972 Vol.1 y 2 (France's Concert, 1988)
 Live In Paris 1972 Vol.3 (France's Concert, 1989)
 Switzerland 1975 (Domino Records, 1990)
 Buenos Aires Concert 1973 (Yellow Note Records, 1991)
 The Secret Sessions: Recorded at the Village Vanguard 1966-1975 (Milestone, 1996)
 The Sesjun Radio Shows - Unreleased live recordings from 1973 (Out Of The Blue, 2011)
 Live At Art D'Lugoff's Top Of The Gate - Live recordings 1968  (Resonance, 2012)
 Live '66: The Oslo Concerts (Somethin' Cool, 2016)
 Some Other Time: The Lost Session From The Black Forest - Unreleased live recordings from 1968 (Resonance, 2016)
 Another Time: The Hilversum Concert - Unreleased recording of 1968 (Resonance, 2017)
 On A Monday Evening - Unreleased live recording of 1976 at Madison Union Theater, University of Wisconsin (Fantasy, 2017)
 Evans In England - Unreleased live recording of 1969 (Resonance, 2019)

With Art Farmer
 Yama with Joe Henderson (CTI, 1979)

With Mordy Ferber
 Mr. X (Ozone Music, 1995)
 Being There (CDBY, 2005)

With Michael Franks
 One Bad Habit (Warner Bros, 1980)

With Jeff Gardner
 Continuum (Terramar, 2007)

With Art Garfunkel
 Lefty (Columbia, 1988)

With George Garzone
 Alone (NYC Records, 1995)

With Mick Goodrick
 In Pas(s)ing (ECM, 1979)

With Dino Govoni
Breakin' Out (Whaling City Sound, 2001)

With Bunky Green
Places We've Never Been (Vanguard, 1979)

With David Grisman
Hot Dawg (A&M-Horizon 1978)

With Tim Hardin
Tim Hardin 4 (Verve, 1969)

With Billy Hart
 Rah (Gramavision, 1988)

With Richie Havens
 Something Else Again (Verve Forecast, 1967)

With Terumasa Hino
 Double Rainbow (CBS, 1981)

With Jennifer Holliday
 Say You Love Me (Geffen, 1985)

With Freddie Hubbard
 Sweet Return (Atlantic, 1983)

With Sandy Hurvitz
 Sandy's Album Is Here At Last (Verve, 1968)

With Bob James
 All Around The Town (CBS, 1981)

With Andrei Kondakov
 Fairy Tale In The Rain (Outline Records, 2012)
 Blues For 4 (СПб Собака RU, 2005)

With Lee Konitz
 The Lee Konitz Duets (Milestone, 1968)
 Peacemeal (Milestone, 1969)

With Mark Kramer
 Jazz Fiddler on the Roof (Mythic Jazz, 2002 | Twinz, 2005)
 Art of the Heart (Art of Life, 2006)
 Kind of Trio with Joe Chambers (Eroica, 2008 | Strawberry Mansion, 2017)
 Boulders and Mountains (Eroica, 2009 | Blue Node, 2017)
 Art of Music (Strawberry Mansion, 2017)

With Ernie Krivda
 The Alchemist (Inner City, 1978)

With Kronos Quartet
 Music of Bill Evans (Landmark Records, 1986)

With Andy LaVerne
Liquid Silver (DMP, 1984)
Metropolis - Unreleased recording of 1979 (ALV Productions, 2018)

With Tom Lellis
 And In This Corner... (Inner City, 1979)
 Double Entendre (Beamtide Records, 1991)
 Tom Lellis (Solid Records, 2018)

With Dave Liebman
Monk's Mood (Double-Time, 1999)

With Joe Locke
 Moment to Moment - The Music of Henry Mancini (Milestone, 1994)

With Giuseppi Logan
 The Giuseppi Logan Quartet (ESP-Disk, 1965)
 More (ESP-Disk, 1966)

With Enric Madriguera
 The Minute Samba 1932-50, Vol. 2 (Harlequin, 2003)

With Mike Mainieri
 An American Diary (NYC Records, 1995)
 Live At Seventh Avenue South (NYC Records, 1996)

With Melissa Manchester
 Joy (Angel Records, 1997)

With Manhattan Jazz Quintet
 My Funny Valentine (Paddle Wheel, 1986)
 The Sidewinder (Paddle Wheel, 1986)
 Live At Pit Inn (Paddle Wheel, 1986)
 Live At Pit Inn Vol. 2 (Paddle Wheel, 1986)
 My Favorite Things - Live in Tokio (Paddle Wheel, 1986)
 Manhattan Blues (Sweet Basil, 1990)
 Funky Strut (Sweet Basil, 1991)
 Manteca - Live At Sweet Basil (Sweet Basil, 1992)
 Concierto de Aranjuez (Sweet Basil, 1994)

With Herbie Mann
 Peace Pieces - The Music Of Bill Evans (Kokopelli Records, 1995)
 America/Brasil (Lightyear Entertainment, 1997)

With Andrea Marcelli
 Beyond The Blue (Art Of Life, 2005)

With Tania Maria
 Intimidade (Blue Note, 2005)

With Phil Markowitz
 Sno' Peas (Bellaphon, 1981)

With Hugh Masekela
 Home Is Where the Music Is (Blue Thumb Records, 1972)

With Eugene Maslov
 The Face Of Love (Mack Avenue Records, 1999)

With Paul McCandless
 All the Mornings Bring (Elektra, 1979)

With Jay McShann
The Big Apple Bash (Atlantic, 1979)

With Charles Mingus
Me, Myself & Eye - Posthumous recording, Mingus does not play. (Atlantic, 1979)
Something Like a Bird - Posthumous recording, Mingus does not play. (Atlantic, 1980)

With Bob Mintzer
Bop Boy (Explore Records, 2002)

With Bob Moses
Bittersuite In The Ozone (Mozown, 1975)
Visit With The Great Spirit (Gramavision, 1983)

With Gerry Mulligan
 Something Borrowed - Something Blue (Limelight, 1966)

With The New York Art Quartet
 Call It Art (Triple Point, 2013)

With Judy Niemack
 About Time (Sony, 2002)

With Mike Nock
 Ondas (ECM, 1981)

With Claus Ogerman
 Claus Ogerman Featuring Michael Brecker (GRP, 1991)

With Michel Petrucciani
 Michel plays Petrucciani (Blue Note, 1988)

With Marco Pignataro
 Sofia's Heart (CD Baby, 2007)

With David Pomeranz
 Time To Fly (Decca, 1971)

With Emily Remler
 Transitions (Concord, 1983)
 Catwalk (Concord, 1985)

With Alex Riel
 Unriel! (Stunt Records, 1997)

With Ted Rosenthal
 Calling You (CTI Records, 1992)

With Iñaki Sandoval
 Miracielos (Bebyne, 2011)

With Masahiko Satoh
 Chagall Blue (Openskye, 1980)
 Amorphism (Sony, 1985)

With Tom Schuman
 Extremities (GRP, 1990)

With John Scofield
 Who's Who? (Arista/Novus, 1979)

With Phil Seamen
 Phil Seamen Meets Eddie Gómez (Saga, 1968)

With Ben Sidran
 Bop City (Island, 1983)

With Carly Simon
 Torch (Warner Bros, 1981)

With Smappies
 Smappies II (Victor, 1999)

With Tommy Smith
Step by Step (Blue Note Records, 1988)

With David Spinozza
Spinozza (A&M Records, 1978)

With Spyro Gyra
 City Kids (MCA Records, 1983)

With Jeremy Steig
Jeremy & The Satyrs (Reprise, 1968)
Legwork (Solid State, 1970)
Wayfaring Stranger (Blue Note, 1971)
Energy (Capitol, 1971)
Fusion (Groove Merchant, 1972) - contains Energy and additional tracks
Monium (Columbia, 1974)
Outlaws (Enja. 1977)
Lend Me Your Ears (CMP, 1978) with Joe Chambers
Music for Flute & Double-Bass (CMP, 1979)
Rain Forest (CMP, 1980)
Jam (Steig-Gomez Records, 2003)
What's New At F (Tokuma Japan, 2004)

With Steps Ahead
 Step by Step (Better Days, 1980)
 Smokin' in the Pit (NYC Records, 1980)
 Paradox - Live At Seventh Avenue South (Better Days, 1982)
 Steps Ahead (Elektra Musician, 1983)
 Modern Times (Elektra Musician, 1984)

With Richard Stoltzman
Begin Sweet World (RCA, 1986)
Brasil (BMG, 1991)
Hark! (BMG Classics, 1992)
Dreams (RCA, 1995)
Danza Latina (RCA, 1998)

With Ira Sullivan 
The Incredible Ira Sullivan (Stash, 1980)

With Martin Taylor
 Kiss and Tell (Columbia, 1999)

With The Gadd Gang 
The Gadd Gang (A Touch, 1986)
Here & Now (Columbia, 1988)
Live At The Bottom Line (A Touch, 1994)

With Great Jazz Trio
Moreover (East Wind, 1980)
The Session / Sleepy Meets The Great Jazz Trio (Next Wave, 1980)
Chapter II (East Wind, 1981)
Re-Visited - The Great Jazz Trio At The Village Vanguard Volume 1 (Eastworld, 1981)
Re-Visited - The Great Jazz Trio At The Village Vanguard Volume 2 (Eastworld, 1981)
Aurex Jazz Festival' 81 / The Great Jazz Trio & Friends With Nancy Wilson (Eastworld, 1981)
What's New - with Nancy Wilson (East Wind, 1982)
Threesome (Eastworld, 1982)
The Club New Yorker (Interface, 1983)
Easy To Love: Eri Sings Cole Porter - with Eri Ohno (Interface, 1984)
Monk's Mood (Denon, 1984)
N.Y. Sophisticate: A Tribute To Duke Ellington (Denon, 1984)
Ambrosia - with Art Farmer (Denon/Interface, 1984)
The Great Jazz Trio Standard Collection (Interface, 1986)
The Great Jazz Trio Plays Standard (Somethin' Else, 1998)

With Eugenio Toussaint
 Oinos (Música para beber vino) (Urtext, 2008)

With Ralph Towner
 Batik (ECM, 1978)
 Old Friends, New Friends (ECM, 1979)

With McCoy Tyner
 Supertrios (Milestone, 1977)

With Gabriel Vicéns
 Point in Time (Sello Independiente, 2012)

With Roseanna Vitro
 Conviction: Thoughts Of Bill Evans (A-Records, 2001)

With Bennie Wallace
 The Fourteen Bar Blues (Enja Records, 1978)
 Live At The Public Theatre (Enja Records, 1978)
 The Free Will (Enja Records, 1980)
 Mistyc Bridge (Enja Records, 1982)
 Twilight Time (Blue Note, 1985)
 The Art Of Saxophone (Denon, 1987)
 Bordertown (Blue Note, 1988)
 Bennie Wallace (AudioQuest Music, 1998)
 The Nearness Of You (Enja Records, 2003)

With Jack Wilkins
 Merge (Chiaroscuro, 1977)
 Reunion (Chiaroscuro, 2001)

With Larry Willis
Inner Crisis (Groove Merchant, 1973)
Blue Fable (HighNote, 2007)
The Offering (HighNote, 2008)

With Daniel Wong
Daniel Wong Trio (Fonarte Latino 2014)

References

External links

1944 births
The High School of Music & Art alumni
Jazz fusion musicians
Living people
Puerto Rican jazz musicians
Juilliard School alumni
American jazz double-bassists
Male double-bassists
People from Santurce, Puerto Rico
Musicians from San Juan, Puerto Rico
Latin Grammy Award winners
Chesky Records artists
Jazz musicians from New York (state)
21st-century double-bassists
21st-century American male musicians
American male jazz musicians
Steps Ahead members
Manhattan Jazz Quintet members